Eliakim Getzel ben Judah ha-Milzahgi (Smiela – 17 July 1854, Brody), also known by the acronym Rabiyah, was a Polish-born Talmudist.

Biography
Eliakim Getzel ha-Milzahgi was born in the Polish town of Smiela into a prominent rabbinical family that included scholars Ephraim Zalman Margolioth and Jacob of Lissa. He settled in Galicia, where he studied with Kabbalist . He worked as the rabbi of a small town, and later as a teacher and merchant in Lemberg and Brody, all while pursuing Jewish scholarship under the patronage of Berish Blumenfeld.

Ha-Milzahgi wrote primarily about Talmud and Kabbalah. The only published book of his was Sefer Rabiyah (Ofen, 1837), a criticism of Leopold Zunz's Die gottesdienstlichen Vorträgeder Juden: historisch entwickelt and of Solomon Judah Loeb Rapoport's biography of Eleazar ben Kalir. The work contains a critique of gematria, and a dissertation on Kabbalistic literature.

He also wrote unpublished commentaries on the Zohar, the Sefer Raziel HaMalakh, and the Pesikta de-Rav Kahana. He published in the Jewish press a denunciation of the alleged forgeries of Abraham Firkovich, and, in his essay Mirkevet Esh, he argued in favour of permitting train travel on the Sabbath.

Notes

References
 

Date of birth unknown
1854 deaths
Kabbalists
19th-century Polish rabbis
Authors of Kabbalistic works
Authors of works on the Talmud
Hebrew-language writers